Claire Josephine Baker (née Brennan; born 4 March 1971) is a Scottish Labour politician who has served as a Member of the Scottish Parliament (MSP) for the Mid Scotland and Fife region since 2007.

Early life and career
Claire Baker was born on 4 March 1971 in Dunfermline to Margaret (née Edgar) and James Brennan. She grew up in Kelty, and attended primary and secondary schools in Fife. She studied for an MA (Hons) in English Language and Literature at the University of Edinburgh and in 1997 was awarded a PhD from the University of Glasgow.

Career
Baker worked in a variety of research and policy posts. This included working as a Research Officer for the Scottish Parliamentary Labour Group from 1999–2002, Research Officer for the trade union Amicus from 2002–2004, and as Research and Information Manager at the Royal College of Nursing, Scotland from 2004–2005. Immediately prior to being elected to the Scottish Parliament, she was Policy Manager for the Scottish Council for Voluntary Organisations, the umbrella body for charities and community and voluntary organisations in Scotland.

In May 2007 she was elected for the Mid Scotland and Fife region.

In the 2011 election, Baker contested the seat of Mid Fife and Glenrothes but lost to the SNP's Tricia Marwick, who subsequently resigned from the SNP to become the Scottish Parliament Presiding Officer. However, she was successfully returned to the Scottish Parliament as 2nd on Labour's Mid Scotland and Fife regional list.

In the Holyrood election of 2016, Baker unsuccessfully stood in the Kirkcaldy constituency and was defeated by David Torrance of the Scottish National Party, suffering a swing against Labour of 15.8%. She was subsequently returned to the Scottish Parliament as a member for Mid Scotland and Fife on the regional list as Labour's 2nd place candidate.

In 2011 she was Labour's Shadow Minister for Education in the Scottish Parliament and the Deputy Convener of the Education and Culture Committee. She later served on the Scottish Labour front bench as spokesperson for Rural Affairs and Environment (2011–2014), Culture, Europe and External Affairs (2014–2015), and Democracy (covering "constitution, Europe, culture and power in society") (2015–2016). Having served as Scottish Labour's spokesperson on Justice, Baker is currently Shadow Secretary for Culture, Tourism, Europe and External Affairs.

Baker nominated Anas Sarwar in the 2021 Scottish Labour leadership election.

Personal life 
In 2004 she married Richard Baker, who was formerly an MSP for North East Scotland. The couple have one daughter. In 1998, Baker published a Critical Guide to the Poetry of Sylvia Plath.

References

External links 
 
 Claire Baker MSP Personal website

1971 births
Living people
People from Kelty
Labour MSPs
Members of the Scottish Parliament 2007–2011
Members of the Scottish Parliament 2011–2016
Members of the Scottish Parliament 2016–2021
Members of the Scottish Parliament 2021–2026
Female members of the Scottish Parliament